Peretz (rus. Перец, pepper) was a Russian national television channel, broadcasting original entertainment programming along with popular Russian and Western series. It began broadcasting on 7 June 1999 as "Darial TV", rebranded in 2002 to "DTV-Viasat", in 2007 to "DTV" and finally took its current name in 2011. The technical penetration of the channel was 72.5% (in 2010). It broadcasts in over 400 cities in Russia.
The channel was changed to a new channel in Russia, "Che", copying "Peretz International" programs. Now, the international version "Peretz International" is on air only. The owner of "Che" is CTC Media.

History of channel 
Originally, the channel was to be entirely devoted to exemplary programming, without pornography, sex or violence. Prior to the acquisition of Viasat, the channel aired virtually no new TV programs: the schedule consisted of reruns of existing shows and films from the Soviet era.

In 2001 Natalia Daryalova and her father Arkady Vainer, sold the channel to Modern Times Group. After the sale, the original name of the channel was changed to the less personal DTV. The concept of the channel was changed, including the logo and the name.

At the same time, the founder of the channel Arkady Vainer criticized the actions of the new owners "for the emergency unemployment creative units of the former Darial-TV and the creation of the moral and legal TV channel for the stallions".

In 2002 the channel had difficulty renewing its broadcast license, due to the actions of previous owners. Authorities also cited the demonstration of hidden advertising of alcoholic beverages, and absenteeism on the air. Due to violations of the conditions, the broadcasting frequency was twice put up for auction in November 2002, an action which was later declared invalid. The ether was stored for 5 years.

On 1 February 2003 the network launched the concept of "7 thematic channels in one", which has since run its course.

In 2005–2007, the channel created and showed series of documentary films named How Went Idols.

After buying the TV channel, CTC Media held a rebranding of the channel, and changed the letters «DTV» in Cyrillic. The inscription «VIASAT» has been removed. 
According to the initiators of the re-branding, "the channel will be entirely domestic, and will be even closer to the Russian audience, because, according to recent studies, the audience has more and more confidence in Russian brands" At about this same time, the bulk of DTV airtime became dedicated to TV series and documentaries in Russia and abroad on criminal topics, united under the heading "The detective on the DTV Channel." In connection with this, the channel identified its initials DTV as an abbreviation for "Detective Television". The channel held a broadcasting schedule until the television season 2010–2011.

On 17 October 2011 DTV conducted a large-scale rebranding, changed the name to "Peretz" (Russian: Перец) and decided to completely change the concept of the channel. According to Dmitry Troitsky (the new CEO of the channel, who previously worked at the STS and TNT,) «Peretz" – a burning TV, "the first lightweight adult channel for those who have stayed in the shower Drive», which show will be supported by CTC Media.

On 12 November 2015 it was announced that the channel will be rebranded to Che as confirmed by CTC Media. However, it was later confirmed that the change would take place on over-the-air broadcasting only and Peretz would continue broadcasting on cable and satellite television.

See also 
 STS
 CarambaTV.ru
 +100500

References

External links 
 изменение каналов DTV и Перец
 Modern Times Group (MTG)

Defunct television channels in Russia
Television channels and stations established in 1999
Television channels and stations disestablished in 2015
1999 establishments in Russia
2015 disestablishments in Russia